Chams-Eddine Faraji (born 1 September 2000) is a French footballer who is last known to have played as a defender for Radomiak.

Career

As a youth player, Faraji joined the youth academy of English second division side Hull City

In 2019, Faraji signed for Radomiak in the Polish second division after playing for English eighth division club Greenwich Borough.

References

External links
 

Association football defenders
2000 births
Radomiak Radom players
French expatriate footballers
French expatriates in Poland
French sportspeople of Moroccan descent
Expatriate footballers in England
Living people
Expatriate footballers in Poland
French footballers